Manuchar III Jaqeli (1591–1625), of the House of Jaqeli, was the last atabeg of the principality of Samtskhe, nominally ruling between 1607 and 1625. As a child, he accompanied his father, Manuchar II Jaqeli, when the latter settled at the Safavid Iranian court, then located at Qazvin. Later, when the Iranian royal court had already been moved to Isfahan, his mother Elene had been making efforts in order for her son to be able to succeed as the next atabeg. She discussed the matter at court with then incumbent Safavid king Abbas I (r. 1588–1624), Alexander II of Kakheti, as well as the Portuguese diplomat Antonio de Gouvea. With Manuchar III living at the court, Elene herself received "virtually nothing" from Abbas I, although she had offered him sovereignty over Samtskhe. Having been confirmed in 1607 as ruler of Samtskhe by Abbas I, Manuchar III continued to fight the Ottomans in a similar fashion to his father. However, he ceased his activities in 1608, when due to the circumstances, he was forced to flee to Kartli. Following his father's death in 1614, Manuchar III now officially claimed the title of atabeg of Samtskhe and made active efforts to incite anti-Ottoman sentiments in the area. Later, in 1624, he battled against the Ottoman pasha of Erzurum; shortly after, he moved to Kartli once again. There, he supported Giorgi Saakadze against the Iranians, and was reputable at the Battle of Marabda. In 1625, he resumed relations with the Ottomans, who subsequently confirmed him as atabeg of Samtskhe; when he actually returned to Samtskhe however, he was killed (poisoned) by his own uncle Beka Jaqeli, better known as Sefer Pasha. Manuchar III was the last Christian ruler of Samtskhe; upon his death in 1625, the Ottomans completely incorporated the western part of the principality of Samtskhe as a pashalik. In 1639, by the Treaty of Zuhab, they also gained the eastern part, which had been under Safavid control. The members of the House of Jaqeli, who had been at the head of the principality for centuries, converted to Islam, and remained in power as hereditary pashas in the Ottoman service.

References

Sources
 
 
 
 

1591 births
1625 deaths
Atabegs of Samtskhe
16th-century people from Georgia (country)
17th-century people from Georgia (country)
Georgians from the Ottoman Empire
Ottoman governors of Georgia
Safavid appointed rulers of Samtskhe
Iranian people of Georgian descent
House of Jaqeli
Deaths by poisoning
17th-century people of Safavid Iran